Doug Muirhead (born 20 March 1962) is a Canadian former soccer player who played for the national team from 1989 to 1992.

Club career
Muirhead played for Canadian Soccer League outfit Vancouver 86ers, for whom he also played in the A-League. He spent a year with the Toronto Blizzard in 1991.

International career
A striker, Muirhead made his debut for Canada in an April 1989 friendly match against Denmark, He earned a total of 6 caps, scoring 1 goal.

His final international game was an April 1992 friendly match against China, in which he scored his only international goal.

He also represented Canada at the inaugural 1989 FIFA Futsal World Championship in the Netherlands.

International goals
Scores and results list Canada's goal tally first.

References

External links
 

1962 births
Living people
Association football forwards
Canadian soccer players
Canada men's international soccer players
Canadian men's futsal players 
Vancouver Whitecaps (1986–2010) players
Canadian Soccer League (1987–1992) players